Georg Mohr (born 2 February 1965) is a Slovenian chess player and chess journalist. In 1992, 1994, 1996, 1998, 2000 and 2002, Mohr played for the Slovenian Olympic team. For the next three Chess Olympiads, he was selector of Slovenian Olympic men's team. In 2004 he was awarded the title of FIDE Senior Trainer.

External links
 
 Georg Mohr at 365Chess.com
 Georg Mohr at Šahovska zveza Slovenije

1965 births
Living people
Slovenian chess players
Chess grandmasters
Chess coaches
Chess Olympiad competitors
Sportspeople from Maribor